Robert Joseph Dwyer (August 1, 1908 – March 24, 1976) was an American prelate of the Roman Catholic Church. He was the fifth Archbishop of Portland from 1966 to 1974, having previously served as the second Bishop of Reno (1952–66).

Early life and education
Dwyer was born in Salt Lake City, Utah, the only child of John Charles and Mabel (née Maynard) Dwyer. His father was of Irish descent, and his mother of French Canadian. He attended Wasatch Public School and Judge Memorial High School. In 1925, he enrolled at the Marist Seminary in Langhorne, Pennsylvania. Shortly afterwards, he transferred to St. Patrick's Seminary in Menlo Park, California.

Priesthood
On June 11, 1932, Dwyer was ordained to the priesthood by Bishop Edward Kelly. He was the first native Utahn to be ordained a priest for the Diocese of Salt Lake City. His first assignment was as a curate at the Cathedral of the Madeleine, where he remained for two years. From 1934 to 1938, he served as chaplain at the College of Saint Mary-of-the-Wasatch and editor of The Intermountain Catholic. He was then sent to continue his studies at the Catholic University of America in Washington, D.C., where he earned a Doctor of Philosophy degree in 1941 with a thesis entitled: "The Gentile Comes to Utah: A Study in Religious and Social Conflict 1862-1890".

Following his return to Utah, Dwyer served as diocesan superintendent of Catholic schools (1941–52) and resumed his position as editor of the diocesan newspaper. He became diocesan director of the Society for the Propagation of the Faith in 1942. He was named rector of the Cathedral of the Madeleine in 1948, and raised to the rank of Monsignor in 1950.

Episcopacy
He was appointed the second Bishop of the Roman Catholic Diocese of Reno in Reno, Nevada on May 19, 1952 by Pope Pius XII, and was consecrated August 5, 1952. Pope Paul VI appointed him the fifth Archbishop of the Roman Catholic Archdiocese of Portland, in Portland, Oregon, on December 9, 1966.  Retiring on January 22, 1974 due to ill health, he died in Piedmont, California on March 24, 1976.

As a historian
Dwyer began his work as a historian of the American west at the Catholic University of America, in Washington, D.C. in 1938, receiving his Ph.D. in history in 1941.  His dissertation was published as The Gentile Comes to Utah:  A Study in Religious and Social Conflict (1862-1890) and is considered an accomplished and objective work on the religious history of early Utah.  Dwyer described Mormonism as an attempt to resurrect the idea of creating an ideal human order on earth.  Sections of this work addressed the conflicts between the religious stance of Brigham Young, President of the Church of Jesus Christ of Latter-day Saints and the antipolygamy crusade launched by the federal government (The Gentile Comes to Utah, p. 97, Topping, p. 40).

Although his work as a historian was secondary to his religious calling, he served as a member of the governing and editorial boards of the Utah State Historical Society from 1943 to 1952.  Dwyer periodically acted as editor to the Utah Historical Quarterly, and produced two noted volumes.  In 1943, he edited work on the diary of Albert Tracy, a soldier in Albert Sidney Johnston's troops during the Utah War and in 1946 he edited a volume on Mormon pioneer Lorenzo Dow Young which contained a biography of Young by James Amasa Little, an edited diary of Lorenzo Dow Young and additional information on the pioneer's extensive family.

After he became Archbishop, Dwyer became a member of the board of advisors of the Western History Center at the University of Utah.

Publications
The Gentile Comes to Utah:  A Study in Religious and Social Conflict (1862-1890).  Washington D.C., Catholic University of America Press, 1941, republished in 1971.

References

Topping, Gary.  Utah Historians and the Reconstruction of Western History.  2003, University of Oklahoma Press, Norman, Oklahoma.

External links
 Archbishop Dwyer biography

1908 births
1976 deaths
Roman Catholic archbishops of Portland in Oregon
Roman Catholic bishops of Reno
Saint Patrick's Seminary and University alumni
Catholic University of America alumni
Participants in the Second Vatican Council
Catholic University of America faculty
Clergy from Salt Lake City
Roman Catholic Diocese of Salt Lake City
20th-century Roman Catholic archbishops in the United States
20th-century American historians
American male non-fiction writers
Religious leaders from Utah
Writers from Salt Lake City
20th-century American male writers
American people of Irish descent
American people of French-Canadian descent